The Melbourne Renegades are an Australian professional men's Twenty20 franchise cricket club based in Melbourne, the capital city of the Australian state of Victoria.  They compete in the Australian Twenty20 cricket competition, the Big Bash League. The team is coached by David Saker and captained by Nic Maddinson.

History

Inaugural seasons (2011–2013)

The Renegades' foundation captain was Victorian all-rounder Andrew McDonald and coached by then Victorian Bushrangers one-day coach, Simon Helmot. In their first season, the Renegades signed local state players such as Aaron Finch, Glenn Maxwell, Brad Hodge and Dirk Nannes, along with Pakistani imports Shahid Afridi and Abdul Razzaq. The Renegades struggled in their first season, only winning two games against the Sydney Thunder and the Sydney Sixers respectively. Aaron Finch scored 259 runs, whilst Shahid Afridi took 10 wickets.

The 2012–13 Big Bash League season saw the Renegades release several star players including the previous seasons captain, Andrew McDonald. However, the recruitment of consistent players such as Ben Rohrer and Peter Nevill and cricket legend Muttiah Muralitharan, saw the season being the Renegades most successful season to date, finishing on top of the ladder, only losing to the Perth Scorchers in the regular season. Aaron Finch also became the first Renegades player to score a century after scoring 111 from 65 balls against the Melbourne Stars. The Renegades were knocked out by the Brisbane Heat in the semi-finals, losing by 15 runs.

Lean years (2013–2017)

Despite maintaining the majority of their squad from the previous season, and also recruiting Australian test bowlers Peter Siddle and James Pattinson, the Renegades struggled in the 2013–14 Big Bash League season, only winning 3 games, and in the process finishing 6th and missing the finals.

Similarly to the previous season, the Renegades headed into the 2014–15 Big Bash League season with confidence after signing Matthew Wade and Callum Ferguson in the pre-season, but failed to qualify for the finals yet again, finishing 6th. The poor run from the previous season resulted in the coach Simon Helmot being sacked.

The Renegades appointed David Saker as the new coach for the 2015–16 Big Bash League season. The Renegades also signed experienced players Cameron White, Xavier Doherty and Chris Gayle to strengthen their squad.

Renegades got a big boost by signing Brad Hogg, Sunil Narine and Thisara Perera for the 2016–17 Big Bash League season, however narrowly missed finals, finishing 5th on the table.

Successful seasons (2017–2019)

The 2017–18 Big Bash League season saw the Renegades rejuvenate their squad, with Jack Wildermuth, Mohammad Nabi, Kieron Pollard, Tim Ludeman, Kane Richardson, along with the return of inaugural 2011–12 Renegades player Brad Hodge. They qualify for the finals for the first time after 5 years; finishing 3rd on the table and winning 6 of their 10 matches. However they were knocked out in semi-final by Adelaide Strikers by one run at Adelaide Oval in front of 36,298 fans.

With the retirements of Brad Hogg and Brad Hodge, the 2018–19 Big Bash League season was similar to the previous, with the Renegades making crucial signings such as Dan Christian, Cameron Boyce, Harry Gurney and Usman Shinwari. The Renegades finished the regular season in second place behind the Hobart Hurricanes, earning a home semi-final against the Sydney Sixers at Docklands. Chasing 181 runs for victory, the Renegades were 6/148, needing 33 runs from 14 balls. They chased the total down with one ball to spare thanks to Dan Christian and Kane Richardson hitting vital boundaries off the bowling of Sean Abbott and Ben Dwarshuis. Due to cross-town rivals, the Melbourne Stars upsetting the Hurricanes in their semi-final the night before, the final was a home Melbourne Derby at Docklands two days after their victory over the Sixers.

The final saw the Stars win the toss and elect to field in front of 40,816 fans. They had the Renegades 5/65 after 10.2 overs, but an unbeaten 80 run partnership between Dan Christian and Tom Cooper saw the Renegades post a modest total of 145 after their 20 overs. The Renegades initially struggled defending the total, with the Stars being 0/93, needing 53 runs off the final 43 deliveries. What transpired next has gone down as one of the biggest "chokes" in Australian sporting history, with the Stars losing 7 wickets in the next five overs and struggling at 7/112. Despite some late hitting from Adam Zampa, the Stars fell 13 runs short, giving the Renegades their first BBL title. Dan Christian was named man of the match for his match saving 38	runs off 30 balls, and 2 wickets for 33 runs off his 4 overs of bowling.

Consecutive wooden spoons (2019–2022)

Following the success of the 2018–19 championship victory, coach Andrew McDonald left his role as head coach in October 2019, less than two months before the beginning of the 2019–20 Big Bash League season. Michael Klinger, who had recently retired from first-class cricket, was appointed coach of the Renegades on 26 November 2019. After signing Pakistani visa players Usman Shinwari and Faheem Ashraf, they pulled out on the eve of the start of the season. Their replacements were English duo Harry Gurney, who played in the BBL championship the previous season, and Richard Gleeson. The Renegades struggled with injuries and form throughout the season, finishing the season in 8th position, but did finish the season on the winners list, defeating the Brisbane Heat by seven wickets.

The following season in 2020–21 had a similar outcome to its predecessor. Visa recruit Imran Tahir pulled out of the season due to personal reasons, and returning Australian test bowler James Pattinson was re-called to the national team and was unavailable for selection. Frontline spinner Cameron Boyce also withdrew from the season due to illness. Despite winning their first match of the season against the Perth Scorchers, the Renegades hit an all-time low, losing two matches by over 100 runs, and being consistently outperformed. The season did however see the unearthing of young players such as Jake Fraser-McGurk, Mackenzie Harvey, Will Sutherland, Zak Evans, Mitchell Perry and Peter Hatzoglou. The Renegades finished the season in 8th position again, but did register one more victory in comparison to the previous season. Just days after the Renegades' final victory of the 2020–21 season against the Hobart Hurricanes, Michael Klinger stood down as head coach. Aaron Finch also stood down as captain of the team just weeks before the start of the 2021–22 Big Bash League season, replaced by new recruit Nic Maddinson. This didn't result in a change of fortune as the Renegades finished in 8th position for the third reason in a row. The shining highlight was Cameron Boyce taking four wickets in a row in the final match of the season against the Sydney Thunder.

Home ground

The Renegades have played its home games at Docklands Stadium since the league's inception in 2011. A drop-in pitch is used to facilitate cricket at the venue. At the end of the 2016–17 Big Bash League season, the stadium was rated the most entertaining venue for Twenty20 cricket in Australia.

Since the 2017–18 Big Bash League season, the Renegades have also played up to 2 home matches at Kardinia Park in Geelong, approximately 70 kilometres south-west of Melbourne.

Due to the COVID-19 pandemic, the 2020–21 Big Bash League season saw the Renegades play home matches interstate at Blundstone Arena in Hobart, Metricon Stadium on the Gold Coast and Adelaide Oval in Adelaide due to quarantine issues. Only three home games in Victoria were played, with two at Docklands and one at the Melbourne Cricket Ground.

Players

Playing squad
The current squad of the Melbourne Renegades for the 2022–23 Big Bash League season as of 16 January 2023.
 Players with international caps are listed in bold.

Captains

Team of the Decade (2011–2021)
On 28 January 2021, to celebrate the inaugural decade of the club and the league, the Renegades announced their team of the decade. All 93 players who had played for the Renegades were eligible for selection, but only two overseas players were permitted in the final XI, in line with the rules for nine of the ten seasons of the competition.

  Aaron Finch (captain)
  Shaun Marsh
  Sam Harper (wicket-keeper)
  Ben Rohrer
  Tom Cooper
  Dan Christian
  Dwayne Bravo
  Cameron Boyce
  Kane Richardson
  Nathan Rimmington
  Muttiah Muralitharan
  Mohammad Nabi (12th man)

Administration and support staff

Current staff
The current administration and support staff of the Melbourne Renegades for the 2021–22 Big Bash League season as of 29 November 2021.

Managerial history

Identity

The official mascot of the team – 'Sledge' – was revealed on 2 November 2011 after online voting on the team's official Facebook page.

The mascot has been described as the future of cricket. He comes from the year 2020 and wears industrial gear clad in corrugated shin pads and a futuristic helmet that hides his true identity.

For the 2014–15 season a new female mascot, Willow was added, with the club also retaining the Sledge mascot.

Support and fan following
The Renegades averaged 13,323 fans to their home games for the inaugural BBL season, and 13,406 supporters in their second BBL season. The average attendance increased by a huge margin in the third season when they registered an average crowd of 21,929. The fourth season had an even better average crowd of 22,324 fans for their home matches.

Their highest home attendance was to the Melbourne Derby in their third BBL season, attracting 42,837 fans. The biggest non-home attendance in BBL history occurred in the 2015–16 season against the Stars, with 80,883 present. Their largest non-Derby attendance was 30,018, which came in their seventh BBL season against the Perth Scorchers.

Renegades' members have steadily increased with every passing season. They reached their biggest membership mark ever for a season two weeks before the start of the 2015–16 Big Bash League season.

Rivalry with Melbourne Stars

When the league began in 2011, Cricket Australia decided they would place two teams in Melbourne. With the core group of players for both sides coming from the Victoria cricket team, this rivalry automatically became widely anticipated in Melbourne. The derby between the new two teams, the Melbourne Stars and the Melbourne Renegades, quickly became hugely popular with big crowds flocking in to the derby matches at both the MCG and Etihad Stadium in Melbourne. In BBL05, during the first leg of the two derbies at the MCG, it drew a record crowd of 80,883 which is the highest crowd for any domestic cricket match ever in the history of the sport.

  Denotes BBL play-off matches.
  Denotes BBL grand final matches.

Sponsors

Honours

Domestic
Big Bash League:
Champions (1): 2018–19
Runners-Up (0): 
Minor Premiers (1): 2012–13
Finals Series Appearances (3): 2012–13,  2017–18, 2018–19
Wooden Spoons (3): 2019–20, 2020–21, 2021–22

Records and statistics

Season summaries

See also

Melbourne Renegades (WBBL)
Big Bash League
Cricket Victoria
Twenty20 cricket

Notes

References

External links
 

Melbourne Renegades (BBL)
Cricket clubs in Melbourne
Cricket clubs in Victoria (Australia)
2011 establishments in Australia
Cricket clubs established in 2011
Cricket in Melbourne